Theodor Dimitrie Speranția (born Theodor Dimitrie Nădejde ; May 4, 1856 – March 9, 1929) was a Romanian playwright, humorist, folklorist and journalist.

Born in Deleni, Iași County, his father was D. Nădejde, a Romanian Orthodox deacon; his son was poet Eugeniu Sperantia; and he was the cousin of political brothers Ioan and Gheorghe Nădejde. He attended primary school at Târgu Frumos, where a teacher changed Nădejde to Speranția (both words, the first Slavic and the second Latin in origin, signify 'hope'). He then entered the Veniamin Costachi seminary in Iași, which he left under the influence of socialist ideas. Subsequently, he entered the faculties of science and of literature and philosophy at the University of Iași. Together with the Nădejde brothers and Nicolae Russel, he published the socialist newspaper Besarabia. He entered the Iași socialist circle in 1880 and was one of the founders of its Contemporanul magazine, to which he contributed from 1881 to 1888. At that point, he moved to Bogdan Petriceicu Hasdeu's . Together with Zamfir Arbore and Ștefan Besarabeanu, he published  in 1891. He enrolled at the University of Liège, where he earned a doctorate in literature and philosophy in 1886. While there, he became acquainted with the European folklore revival and delved into comparative literature. He subsequently moved to the Romanian capital Bucharest. In 1906, in a private capacity, he taught a course on domestic folk literature at the University of Bucharest.

He was elected a corresponding member of the Romanian Academy in 1891.

Notes

1856 births
1929 deaths
People from Iași County
Alexandru Ioan Cuza University alumni
19th-century Romanian dramatists and playwrights
20th-century Romanian dramatists and playwrights
Romanian folklorists
Romanian poets
Romanian humorists
Romanian novelists
Romanian children's writers
Romanian magazine editors
Romanian magazine founders
Romanian newspaper editors
Romanian socialists
Corresponding members of the Romanian Academy